Neoepitola is a genus of butterflies in the family Lycaenidae, endemic to the Afrotropical realm. It consists of only one species, Neoepitola barombiensis, which is found in Cameroon, the Republic of the Congo, the Democratic Republic of the Congo (Sankuru) and western Uganda.

References

External links
Die Gross-Schmetterlinge der Erde 13: Die Afrikanischen Tagfalter. Plate XIII 65 a

Poritiinae
Monotypic butterfly genera
Taxa named by Thomas Herbert Elliot Jackson
Lycaenidae genera